Stir It Up is a 1992 studio album by Christian music vocal group The Imperials. It's the group's third album on Star Song Records.

The personnel line-up for this album consists of Armond Morales, David Will, Jonathan Pierce (still under his birth name Jonathan Hildreth) and Pam Morales. In 1993, Pam Morales would retire from the group after the release of Stir It Up and Pierce also left the group and a year later was offered a spot on Bill Gaither's southern gospel quartet the Gaither Vocal Band and a couple of years later started his solo recording career in contemporary Christian music. This would be the final full album of the Imperials' commercial contemporary pop sound of previous albums as the group would undergo another lineup change and a return to their four-part harmony of their early years. The album's first radio single "Taking Your Love for Granted" would give the group their final number one song on the Christian radio charts. The Imperials have had number one songs in three decades from the 1970's, 1980's and 1990's. Stir It Up climbed up to number 20 on the Billboard Top Christian Albums chart.

Track listing

Personnel 

The Imperials
 Jonathan Pierce – tenor, co-lead vocals
 Pam Morales – alto, co-lead vocals
 David Will – baritone, vocals
 Armond Morales – bass, vocals

Musicians
 Brian Green – keyboards, bass programming 
 Paul Mills – additional keyboards, additional programming; keyboards, bass, drums and percussion programming (4)
 Tony Miracle – keyboard programming (9)
 Jerry McPherson – guitars 
 Mark Hammond – drums and percussion programming, bass programming (2, 9), additional drums and percussion programming (4)
 Mark Douthit – saxophones (2, 4, 6, 8)
 Lisa Bevill – additional backing vocals 
 Chris Harris – additional backing vocals, BGV and group vocal arrangements 
 Chris Rodriguez – additional backing vocals 
 Guy Penrod – additional backing vocals (9)
 Angelo Petrucci – additional backing vocals (9)
 Veronica Petrucci – additional backing vocals (9)
 Shirley M. Settles – additional backing vocals (9)
 Ken "Scat" Springs – additional backing vocals (9)

Production
 Armond Morales – executive producer 
 Jeff Moseley – executive producer 
 Paul Mills – producer, recording, mixing 
 Ricky Cobble – assistant engineer 
 Hank Williams – mastering at MasterMix (Nashville, Tennessee)
 Scott Brickell and Chad Williams – production management at Chapel Hill Management 
 Toni Thigpen – art direction 
 Tufts Design Studio – design, layout 
 Jeff Frasier – photography

Critical reception 
Tony Cummings of Cross Rhythms gave Stir It Up 7 out of 10 saying that producer Paul Mills "gives the group some nice funky synth-pop arrangements full of 1992 appeal though I'd love to know what the youth thinks of a group manned in part by grizzled wrinkles targeting music splat them. My favorites on this set are 'Taking Your Love For Granted,' an infectious midtempo throbber, and the somewhat slower and funkier 'We're All Looking.' Amercian audiences can seemingly turn out quality pop gospel like this at will, and I can imagine quite a few Christian jocks giving this a radio airing."

Charts

Radio singles

References

1992 albums
The Imperials albums